Anis Gallali (born 15 July 1972) is a retired Tunisian long jumper.

He won the gold medal at the 1996 African Championships and the silver medal at the 1998 African Championships, the latter in 8.01 metres. This remained his lifetime best jump, and is also the Tunisian record.

He became Tunisian champion in 1993, 1995 and 2002.

Competition record

References

1972 births
Living people
Tunisian long jumpers
Athletes (track and field) at the 1997 Mediterranean Games
Athletes (track and field) at the 2001 Mediterranean Games
Mediterranean Games competitors for Tunisia
20th-century Tunisian people
21st-century Tunisian people